Anthurium marmoratum is a species of plant in the genus Anthurium native to western Colombia and Ecuador. It is a member of the section Cardiolonchium, or the velvet-leaved Anthuriums, along with A. papillilaminum, A. regale, A. crystallinum, and others. It is one of many species used by curanderos in South America to treat snakebite.

References

marmoratum
Plants described in 1903